Marathwada Liberation Day, also known as Marathwada Mukti Sangram Din is celebrated in Maharashtra on 17 September annually. It marks the anniversary of Marathwada's integration with India when the Indian military, liberated State of Hyderabad, and defeated the Nizam on 17 September 1948, 13 months after Indian independence.

History
India gained independence from British on 15 August 1947. After the partition, princely states were given the option to join either India or Pakistan. The ruler of Hyderabad, Osman Ali Khan, decided to remain independent. He also appealed to the United Nations that his princely state, which included current Marathwada and Telangana regions, be granted statehood. This sparked a rebellion in the State. During the revolt Marathwada saw major uprisings against the Razakars . The main leaders of the revolt were Swami Ramanand Tirth, Govindbhai Shroff, Vijayendra Kabra and Ramanbhai Parikh and P H Patwardhan. Bahirji Shinde was martyred at Aajegaon in the fight against Nizam.

The Indian government appeared anxious to avoid what it termed a "Balkanization" of the new country and was determined to integrate Hyderabad into the newly formed Indian Union. Amidst the unrest the Indian government launched a military operation named Operation Polo which it termed a "police action". The operation itself took five days, in which the Razakars were defeated and Hyderabad was annexed.

India was distributed amongst various princely states. At that time 562 out of 565 princely states were interested to integrate within India and they did so. But the Princely states of Hyderabad, Junagadh and Kashmir these three states didn't integrated within India or shown interest in doing so. At that time 'Princely State of Hyderabad' was under the rule of Nizam Mir Osman Ali Khan Bahadoor Niyamuddollah Nizam-ul Mulk Asafzah. To liberate from his state and to integrate within the newly formed Indian Union; major rebellion sparked among the entire region under the leadership of Swami Ramanand Tirth and his mates. The total population of Princely state of Hyderabad at that time was about 1 Crore 60 Lakh. This included Telangana, Marathwada and some portion of Karnataka state.

After the spark of revolt against the state, Nizam's army chief Qasim Razvi started torture on people of the movement . On the other side the movement taken the speed. After which the other leaders rather than Swami Ramanand Tirth had joined the movement in which main leaders were, Digambarrao Bindu, Govindbhai Shroff, Ravinarayana Reddy, Devisingh Chauhan, Bhausaheb Vaishmpayan, Shankarsingh Naik, Vijayendra Kabra, Babasaheb Paranjape and Mohanappa Somnathpurkar and other . Every village has participated into the movement as they were under Nizam's brutality. Many independence fighters came to rescue the state. Even after the mega revolt for liberation the Nizam wasn't in the mood to surrender and gone after the people even harshly. Then, on 13 September 1948 Police action started in the state. Main armed forces intruded from the Solapur side . And within 2 hours of action the parts of Naldurg, And until the evening Tuljapoor, Parbhani to Manigarh, Kanergaon, Bonakal of Vijaywada were captured by the forces.

Forces which intruded from the sides of Chalisgaon captured Kannad, Daulatabad likewise forces entered from the Buldhana side of the state captured the Jalna city. On the other hand, Indian forces attacked on the Varangal, Airport of Bidar. When Indian forces successfully took the Aurangabad on 15 September, forces of Nizam started to back off. On 17 September the army head of Nizam's forces Jan Al Idris surrendered on the same day even Nizam surrendered. Like this Liberation of this Princely state was successfully accomplished. The Britishers left the India with clashes on all side . There would have been 565 Countries on the Indian subcontinent but the ambition of Sardar Vallabh Bhai Patel bought together the Indian Union.He is also referred as the Iron Man of Indian Independence.

Related issues
Marathwada, Telangana and 4 districts of Karnataka were part of the former princely Hyderabad state. Since 1948, when Hyderabad annexed, 17 September has been celebrated as "Liberation day" by Maharashtra and Karnataka. Evidence of which is observed in Pandit Sunderlal Committee Report.

See also

 Hyderabad-Karnataka Liberation Day
 Tourism in Marathwada

References

Observances in India
History of Marathwada
September observances